Smokeless may refer to:
Smokeless powder, propellants that produce little to no smoke
Smokeless tobacco, tobacco that is used by means other than smoking
Smokeless, West Virginia